Márcio Torres (born 24 January 1981) is a tennis player from Brazil. He played in the doubles main draw in an ATP 250 event in Los Angeles in 2011.

References

Sources

Main draw notability in doubles in 2011

Living people
1981 births
Sportspeople from Belo Horizonte
Brazilian male tennis players
21st-century Brazilian people